Extreme Movie (formerly Parental Guidance Suggested; known as Hotdogs & Doughnuts: An Extreme Movie in Australia) is a 2008 American satirical sex comedy film composed of sketches focusing on teen sex. Adam Jay Epstein and Andrew Jacobson direct, with segments co-written by Saturday Night Live performers Will Forte, Andy Samberg, and writers Akiva Schaffer, Jorma Taccone, Phil Lord and Christopher Miller. The ensemble cast includes Frankie Muniz, Ryan Pinkston, Jamie Kennedy, Danneel Harris, Andy Milonakis, Matthew Lillard, Rob Pinkston and Michael Cera.

Plot
The film is a series of vignettes with Matthew Lillard's sex advice intercut within every couple segments. Mike (Ryan Pinkston) tries to impress his crush, Stacy (Cherilyn Wilson). Fred (Michael Cera) meets a girl (Joanna Garcia) online and they arrange for "menacing action", only for Fred to break into the wrong apartment. The promiscuous Betty (Ashley Schneider) going to the "next level" (kinkier and more outrageous sexual adventures) with Chuck (Frankie Muniz), and later Fred. Justin (Andy Milonakis) buys a vibrating vagina and falls in love with it, all the time while crushing on another girl; the vibrating vagina has a personality of its own and commits "suicide" when Justin rejects it.

A Real Sex-esque skit where a girl admits to having sex with two black men on camera. Two guys, Barry and Leon (Kevin Hart and Jermaine Williams), create a woman on their computer, only for her to run wild.

Jessica (Rheagan Wallace), in an attempt to become horny, puts her vibrating cell phone in her vagina, only for it to fall in. Len (Ben Feldman) wakes up to find a girl and another guy (Jamie Kennedy) in his bed, and his parents home as well; the whole thing turns out to be a hidden camera bi sexual show.

Sex education teacher Mr. Matthews (John P. Farley) teaches his class with no rules and a lot of embarrassment, usually centering on Mike. Ronny (Hank Harris), obsessed with Abraham Lincoln, creates a time machine and travels back in time to have sex with Lincoln (Ed Trotta).

Cast

Release
The film was theatrically released internationally by Dimension Films. In the United States, it received a straight-to-DVD release by Dimension Extreme on December 5, 2008, and filming in New York City, New York, Boston, Massachusetts and Los Angeles, California.

Reception
Common Sense Media rated the film 1 out of 5 and called it "an extreme waste of time" and compares it unfavorably to Woody Allen's 1972 film Everything You Always Wanted to Know About Sex.

References

External links
 
 
 

2008 films
2000s English-language films
2000s sex comedy films
American LGBT-related films
American satirical films
American sex comedy films
American teen comedy films
Films produced by Richard Suckle
Films shot in Boston
Films shot in Los Angeles
LGBT-related sex comedy films
Films about time travel
Dimension Films films
Teen sex comedy films
Films with screenplays by John Solomon (writer)
Films with screenplays by Will Forte
Films with screenplays by Andy Samberg
Films with screenplays by Akiva Schaffer
Films with screenplays by Jorma Taccone
2008 comedy films
2008 LGBT-related films
Films with screenplays by Phil Lord
Films with screenplays by Christopher Miller (filmmaker)
2000s American films